is a small village in Daisetsuzan National Park, Kamikawa Subprefecture, Hokkaidō, Japan.

The village consists of a few hotels and a youth hostel. It a popular base for hikers in the national park, and for tourists using Asahidake Ropeway to climb Asahi-dake, Hokkaidō's highest mountain peak. There are several natural primitive hot springs, and also a hot springs resort, with approximately twelve buildings. The nearby ropeway costs 1800 or 2800 yen, depending on the time of year.

Hiking opportunities in the area range from 30- to 60-minute walks all the way up to one- or two-day tours of the area's mountains.  The area is volcanic, and evidence of such activity is plentiful. There are also opportunities for skiing in the area during the winter.

There are buses that run to and from the village year-round.

External links
Japan Guide  A couple of nice pictures and some more detailed tourist information

 

Hot springs of Japan
Tourist attractions in Hokkaido
Villages in Hokkaido